Admiral Sir Simon Alastair Cassillis Cassels,  (5 March 1928 – 6 March 2019) was a senior Royal Navy officer who served as Second Sea Lord and Chief of Naval Personnel from 1982 to 1986.

Naval career
Cassels joined the Royal Navy in 1947. He was Navigation Staff Officer to Chief of the Polaris Executive from 1963 to 1966, and went on to command  in 1972.

Cassels became Assistant Chief of the Naval Staff (Operational Requirements) in 1978, Flag Officer, Plymouth and Admiral Superintendent at Devonport in 1981, and Second Sea Lord and Chief of Naval Personnel as well as President of the Royal Naval College, Greenwich in 1982; he retired in 1986.

Later life
In retirement Cassels's activities included serving as Chairman of the Modern Apprentices Advisory Committee. He lived at Exton in Hampshire.

Cassels died on 6 March 2019, aged 91.

Family
Cassels was married to Jill.

References

|-

1928 births
2019 deaths
Admiral presidents of the Royal Naval College, Greenwich
Lords of the Admiralty
Royal Navy admirals
Knights Commander of the Order of the Bath
Commanders of the Order of the British Empire